Timothy Jones Jr. (born December 28, 1981) is an American murderer who killed his five children: Merah, Elias, Nahtahn, Gabriel, and Abigail Elaine, in their mobile home along South Lake Drive in Lexington County, South Carolina. Jones admitted to working Nahtahn to death and killed the other four children in a panic. Jones pleaded not guilty by reason of insanity, but the court rejected this plea. He was found guilty of five counts of murder in 2019 and was sentenced to death. He is currently awaiting execution on death row in South Carolina.

Personal life
Timothy Jones Junior was born in 1981 to Timothy Jones Senior and Cindy Jones, who was 16 when she became pregnant. Her husband described Cindy Jones as violent and erratic. She behaved strangely, giving Timothy Jones Jr. laxatives as an infant and cutting up clothes with knives. Though she was never formally diagnosed, it is believed she had a mental illness. When her son was 18-months-old, she left the family. Timothy Jones Sr. later remarried. In 2001, Jones Jr. was arrested in Illinois for possession of cocaine, check-forgery, car theft. He was sentenced to seven years in prison but was released two years later in 2003.

Timothy Jones Jr. met Amber Kyzer, a Pennsylvania native, in Chicago. In June 2004, 22-year-old Jones married 18-year-old Kyzer in DuPage County, Illinois. Amber Jones gave birth to five children: Merah, born in Pennsylvania, Elias and Nahtahn, born in Mississippi, and Gabriel and Abigail, born in South Carolina. In 2011, Jones graduated from Mississippi State University with a degree in computer engineering. He moved to South Carolina to work as an engineer for Intel in Columbia, earning a salary of approximately $71,000 annually. The couple moved into an inexpensive trailer in Lexington County in the suburbs of Columbia; Amber Jones was a stay-at-home mother. In her testimony at trial, Amber Jones indicated that her husband believed, "women are to be seen and not heard, keep the children out of the way… at one point wanted a farm full of children." Jones is a strict Christian fundamentalist. After his arrest, police seized his religious belongings, including scripture with verses highlighted on corporal punishment.

Divorce
The couple separated for two weeks in May 2012, and according to Jones's divorce lawyer, when Jones returned to their shared home, he discovered that his wife "was putting the children to bed and then going next door to meet her paramour." According to court records, Amber Jones was having an affair with a 19-year-old neighbor. Jones began meeting with a family therapist and marriage counselor, April M. Hames. He stated that he distrusted his wife because of his troubled childhood. He also accused his wife of neglecting the children, resulting in the state's Department of Social Services (DSS) opening an investigation in the family's home in 2011. Investigators found the home in a state of disarray but closed the case. The couple remained split, with Timothy Jones taking the children to Mississippi to live with his parents. In later court depositions, Dr. Hames noted that Jones "did not want to feel abandoned by his wife." When Amber Jones became pregnant with the couple's youngest child, Abigail, Timothy Jones was tested to verify he was the biological father, which he was. The couple finalized their divorce in October 2013. Timothy Jones was awarded custody, while Mrs. Jones only retained visitation rights and was required to be supervised by her husband. Timothy Jones and the children moved back to Lexington County to another mobile. The mother's visits rarely took place at the rented trailer. Rather, they usually occurred at a Chick-fil-A in Lexington. Reportedly, Jones allowed his ex-wife to talk to the children over the phone each night. On Sunday evenings, Jones allowed his children to participate at youth night programs at The Salvation Army.

Jones lived in a trailer off of a dirt road in Red Bank, a neighborhood of Lexington, South Carolina. Jones was investigated twice for child abuse during this time, but investigators found no evidence that would warrant removing the children from home. In May 2014, one child said that Jones spanked him and forced him to do exercises as punishment. But since there were no bruises, investigators considered the punishment lawful. Two weeks later, Jones was again accused of abuse. The case file reported, "Mr. Jones beats the child often leaving bruising. Mr. Jones does not feed the children adequately...It is reported Mr. Jones does not want to send his children back to public schools because he does not want the school to report the beatings." Further, the caseworker noted, "Dad appears to be overwhelmed as he is unable to maintain the home." This investigation was not concluded before the children's murder.

The murders
On Thursday, August 28, 2014, Timothy Jones picked up his three eldest children, Merah, Elias, and Nahtahn from Saxe Gotha Elementary School, and his two youngest, Gabriel and Abigail, from a nearby daycare. That afternoon, Jones unsafely forced the five children out of the car at a Lexington County Walmart, an action for which he would later be charged with unlawful neglect. Amber Jones called the family home at 7:12 p.m. and spoke to one of her sons, Nahtahn. After that, she could not communicate with Jones or her children. Authorities estimate that Jones most likely killed his children the night of August 28. He wrapped their corpses in black trash bags, using bleach to cover the stench of decay. Jones later admitted to killing his children on August 28 in the family home; it is possible that the other children were dead when Amber Jones spoke to Nahtahn. In the trial, Travis Pressley, a prison guard, testified that Jones admitted to strangling his eldest daughter after she witnessed him murdering one of her brothers. Jones reported that he became angry after Nahtahn broke an electrical outlet and forced him to do physical exercises. Jones claimed that he found his son dead in his bed, which encouraged him to kill the others. In his confession, Jones said that he "PT'd his ass until he couldn't handle it anymore" to get the child to explain what happened to the electrical outlets. However, experts suggested that Nahtahn appeared to be strangled to death, discounting Jones's assertion. Jones admitted to strangling his youngest children with a belt, claiming their necks were too small for his hands to strangle properly. Stephanie Stanley, a DNA-specializing agent with SLED, positively identified the mutilated bodies from matching DNA strands found in Jones's car and home.

On September 1, Jones stopped at a Dunkin' Donuts on Labor Day in Spartanburg, South Carolina. On September 3, he went to a West Columbia Walmart. He purchased several items he used to mutilate his children, including large plastic bins, saws, and muriatic acid. Authorities believed his children were stored in the trunk of the car. His children were marked absent on Friday, Monday, and Tuesday. Also, on September 3, Amber Jones contacted the authorities to inform them she could not reach her ex-husband or her children and that they had missed a scheduled visit at Chick-fil-A. Authorities listed the family as "missing" but did not announce it to the public until the following Tuesday, September 9, six days after their bodies were discovered. Police did not issue an Amber Alert because Timothy Jones was listed as the custodial parent.

Discovery of bodies
The bodies of Jones's five children were discovered in black trash bags off of a rural dirt road near Camden, Alabama. On Saturday, September 6, 2014, Jones was stopped in his Cadillac Escalade at a routine traffic checkpoint in Mississippi. Police noted that Jones seemed "very strange" and "maybe on the violent side." Initially, police suspected him of driving while under the influence of alcohol, but when they checked his South Carolina license plate, they were notified of the missing children. Further, police found blood and materials to produce methamphetamine in Jones's car. They found hand-written notes detailing how to mutilate bodies. He was also high on synthetic marijuana. Several days later, Jones led the Mississippi sheriff and FBI agents to where he had disposed of the corpses of his children. It was later revealed in court that Jones originally planned to dump the bodies near the Mexican border. It is unclear why Jones stopped in Alabama instead. Still, prosecutors posited that the stench of decomposition made Jones change his plans. An officer at the scene spoke that the car "smelled the stench of death" and was filled with blood, bleach, and maggots.

Dr. Janice Ross, who performed the autopsies, cited that the black bags sped up the decomposition process since they were placed in the sun. The bodies had been outdoors for approximately one week before they were recovered. In her report, she indicated that the bodies had been significantly decomposed by animal-eating and maggots. 

Elias was the first autopsy performed. Ross noted that the body was in two separate trash bags and was clothed in a short-sleeved Saxe Gotha shirt. The report indicated that there was "tissue loss at neck; skeletonization at hands, decomposition, skin discoloration, internal organs decomposing, no natural disease, fracture of bone in neck shows strangulation." Merah, the second autopsy, was reportedly unclothed. Ross indicated that the child's left hand was missing and that there was significant tissue loss on her body. Gabriel's autopsy reported that he had "2 parallel lines on side of neck indicative of a ligature, made by something wide such as a belt or sash." Abigail, the fourth autopsy, had an empty stomach and had the least amount of decomposition. Lastly, the fifth autopsy, Nahtahn, revealed that the child's knee was cut with a saw or other sharp object. The body also had an incisor injury on the left femur. Ross determined the cause of death for all five children to be asphyxiation due to manual strangulation, listing each death as a homicide, but was unable to identify a specific time of death because of decay. Further, there was only one child with food in their stomach. Therefore, Ross posited that the children could have already been weak when they were murdered. 

Jones was extradited to South Carolina. The acting sheriff of Lexington County, South Carolina, stated that Jones initially refused to indicate why he murdered his children. According to court records, Jones struggled with feelings of anxiety, betrayal, and mistrust. Later, Jones admitted that he feared his children would kill him. Court records indicated that Jones claimed he feared his kids were "going to kill him, chop him up and feed him to the dogs." Jones was put on suicide watch in jail.

The trial

Confession
Jones pleaded not guilty by reason of insanity. At trial, Jones's recorded testimony was played for the jury. At the beginning of the tape, Jones affirmed that he was not coerced or persuaded into confessing to the murders, except that investigators promised Jones a good burial for his children. Jones professed that he killed his children in the bedroom of the family's mobile home on South Lake Drive in Lexington. He said that he found Nahtahn dead after overworking him with squats and pushups, and that he strangled the other four children. Jones claimed, "any normal person would have said let me call the police and turn myself in. I took the coward route and started following those voices in my head, which led me down such a nice path I'm on today." Jones then stated that he put the five dead bodies, without plastic bags, in the trunk of his vehicle. He described how he originally planned to cut up the corpses, boil, or burn the bodies; he wrote supposed plans on paper. But he claimed he could not bring himself to do it. Jones affirmed that the killings were not premeditated. Still, instead, "this was a oh, shit what just happened?" Jones argued that a demonic gremlin voice told him to murder his children. However, the court-appointed psychologist later declared that Jones made a conscious decision to kill his children. Conversely, Jones's psychiatrist and lawyer defended that he was insane and incapable of reasoning. In court, Jones sobbed throughout the playing of the recording of his confession.

Testimonies
Amber Jones repeatedly indicated that Timothy Jones was "always a good father while we were married." However, she noted that he was Bi-Polar. While he was not officially diagnosed, Amber Jones indicated that he had frequent mood swings and was difficult to talk to, similarly to walking on eggshells. "You really didn’t have to do anything to get him angry. Tim was just angry," she said. "There were more bad times than good down here." Mrs. Jones testified that her husband did not spank his children frequently, instead insisting on physical punishment: push-ups, squats, etc. Mrs. Jones attempted to make it clear that her ex-husband was not insane. Rather, she argued, he was "overangry." Joy Lorick, a family babysitter, described the Jones home as dirty, having bugs, unclean dishes, strewn clothes, and trash scattered about it. Lorick further said that she attempted to tidy up around the house, wash dishes, and feed the children. She testified that one child requested that she not tell the father she fed them "because he might not feed us again." Lorick filed a complaint against Jones with the Department of Social Services after she discovered that one of the children had a black eye.

The school nurse at Saxe Gotha Elementary, Karen Leonhardt, described that the children were "in good health" and that they were up-to-date on their vaccinations and that there was no physical impairments. However, when Merah, the eldest child, appeared at school with head lice, Leonhardt met with Timothy Jones. Jones commented that he used kerosene, a flammable liquid dangerous to the touch and to ingest, to attempt to kill the parasite and their eggs. When Leonhardt suggested using a hair dryer, Jones indicated that he'd prefer to use a heat gun. This interaction prompted Leonhardt to contact DSS. Leonhardt further testified that another teacher, Amy Shearer, called DSS because Nahtahn had bruises around his neck, jawline, and on his arms. Reportedly, Jones held Nahtahn against a wall in a chokehold.

At a gas station in Greenville, Alabama, cashier Linda Watkins testified she noticed a terrible smell when Timothy Jones entered to buy some cigarettes and an energy drink. Jones asked for directions to a rural location where he could camp. On the stand, the police officer that stopped Jones in Alabama stated that when he asked Jones why his car smelled like garbage, Jones replied, "it is garbage."

Prison guard Travis Pressley testified that Jones admitted to killing his daughter, reportedly saying he "choked her 'til she turned purple." Pressley further cited, "He said that when he saw the daughter, she was shocked – and I guess, I don't know, she tried to run away or what – he grabbed her and choked her so hard". Another prison guard, Ben Boyd, said he heard Jones claiming to kill Nahtahn: "his son was just messing with the light socket and he grabbed him and he choked him ... then he said while he was choking his son, his daughter came in the room, and that was the last part I heard."

On day 12 of the trial, a psychiatrist, Richard Frierson, testified that Jones did not have schizophrenia, instead diagnosing him with a substance-induced psychotic disorder. Frierson cited the divorce as a salient reason for Jones's hearing of voices. On the night of the murder, Jones allegedly watched a graphic rape scene from the movie American History X and listened to the song "Butterfly Kisses" by Bob Carlisle. Frierson suggested this meant Jones understood the moral and legal implications of what he did.

Verdict
After 15 days of testimony, on June 4, 2019, a jury found Timothy Jones guilty of all five counts of murder. On June 13, a jury agreed on the existence of an aggravating circumstance and sentenced Jones to death. Jones was one of two men sentenced to death in South Carolina in 2019. He is currently awaiting execution on death row. According to Lexington County officials, South Carolina taxpayers paid $647,653.27 for Jones's trial.

Appeal
In 2021, Jones requested the South Carolina Supreme Court to look at the case. Jones's attorney claims that the trial was unfair.

See also
 List of death row inmates in the United States

Notes

References

Living people
1981 births
21st-century American criminals
American male criminals
American people convicted of murder
Criminals from Chicago
People convicted of murder by South Carolina
Prisoners sentenced to death by South Carolina